A total lunar eclipse will take place on Saturday, October 8, 2033. This will also be a supermoon, the first supermoon lunar eclipse by all definitions since May 26, 2021, unlike May 16 in 2022, which was defined by only some as taking place during a supermoon.

Visibility

Related lunar eclipses

Lunar year series

Saros series
It is part of Saros series 137.

Tzolkinex 
 Preceded: Lunar eclipse of August 28, 2026

 Followed: Lunar eclipse of November 18, 2040

See also
List of lunar eclipses and List of 21st-century lunar eclipses

Notes

External links

2033-10
2033-10
2033 in science